

Hans Jordan (27 December 1892 – 20 April 1975) was a German general during World War II. He was a recipient of the Knight's Cross of the Iron Cross with Oak Leaves and Swords of Nazi Germany.

World War II
Jordan was given command of the 9th Army on 20 May 1944. The Soviet offensive Operation Bagration began on 22 June 1944. In the northern sector the Soviet offensive the 1st Belorussian Front under the command of Colonel General Konstantin Rokossovsky breached the 9th Army defensive positions south and north of Babruysk. The city  was encircled on 27 June 1944; Jordan was relieved of command on 26 June.

Awards
 Iron Cross (1914) 2nd Class (23 September 1914) & 1st Class (15 April 1916)
 German Cross in Gold on 23 December 1943 as General der Infanterie and commanding general of the VI. Armeekorps
 Knight's Cross of the Iron Cross with Oak Leaves and Swords
 Knight's Cross on 5 June 1940 as Oberst and commander of Infanterie-Regiment 49
 59th Oak Leaves on 16 January 1942 as Oberst and commander of Infanterie-Regiment 49
 64th Swords on 20 April 1944 as General der Infanterie and commanding general of the VI. Armeekorps

References
Notes

Bibliography

 
 
 

1892 births
1975 deaths
People from Gernsbach
People from the Grand Duchy of Baden
Generals of Infantry (Wehrmacht)
Recipients of the clasp to the Iron Cross, 1st class
Recipients of the Gold German Cross
Recipients of the Knight's Cross of the Iron Cross with Oak Leaves and Swords
Reichswehr personnel
20th-century Freikorps personnel
Military personnel from Rhineland-Palatinate
German Army generals of World War II